Kavakalanı can refer to:

 Kavakalanı, Balya
 Kavakalanı, Çivril